Loch Carron (Scottish Gaelic: "Loch Carrann") is a sea loch on the west coast of Ross and Cromarty in the Scottish Highlands, which separates the Lochalsh peninsula from the Applecross peninsula, and from the Stomeferry headland east of Loch Kishorn.  It is the point at which the River Carron enters the North Atlantic Ocean.

According to the marine charts, the tidal currents reach  in the narrows, although not much water disturbance is visible in the flow.  At the narrows, the depth of water is less than 20 metres, but in the basins on either side, it extends to a depth of more than 100 metres.  Beneath the cliffs at Strome Castle is a colony of flame shells; with a population of over 250 million the loch is the world's largest flame shell bed, and was designated as a Nature Conservation Marine Protected Area (NCMPA) in 2017, with the protection being made permanent in 2018. The new MPA of 23 km2 took effect on 19 May 2019. Within the MPA the use of fishing gear that may damage the seabed is prohibited, although rod and line fishing and creeling is permitted.

Tourism
Tourism is a significant industry in the Highlands of Scotland and one that generates important local economic activity. It provides employment for local people and attracts many visitors to Wester Ross in general and Lochcarron in particular because of its traditional seaside location.

The Kyle of Lochalsh Line runs along the south side of the loch, with railway stations at Attadale, Stromeferry, Duncraig, and Plockton.

Archaeology 
Between 1999 and 2004. a large scale archaeological project was undertaken, to locate and examine sites relating to the Mesolithic period, in the Inner Sound. In 2002, an offshoot project, the Sea Loch Survey was run by the same archaeologists to survey the sea lochs of Carron and Torridon. Between both projects they found 129 new archaeological sites in the strait. At Loch Carron, nine new sites were found, five caves/rock shelter and four stone tool scatters.

See also
 River Carron
 Lochcarron, a village on the loch
 Stromeferry, situated on the south side at the narrows
 Plockton, village with harbour at the west end from which boat service takes tourists to the seal colony on the islands

References

Bibliography

External links
 Dive Magazine article
 Loch Carron MPA Summary Leaflet - Scottish Natural Heritage

Sea lochs of Scotland
Lochs of Highland (council area)
Nature Conservation Marine Protected Areas of Scotland